Ben Phillips Blows Up is a Welsh entertainment program which follows Ben Phillips and his friends as they prank long suffering Elliot Giles. In December 2016, Comedy Central announced that they had commissioned a new reality prank comedy show based on Phillips' YouTube channel pranks. The series followed Phillips throughout his day-to-day life and let his fans see another side to the online pranks. The series did not last long, since then Philips has released an animated series on YouTube titled 'The Ben and Elliot Show'.

Summary 
The show follows Ben Phillips and his circle of friends playing a prank on his long-suffering brother Elliot Giles, only for it to backfire.

Cast 
This is a list of cast members appearing on Ben Phillips Blows Up.

Development and production 
In December 2016, it was announced that Comedy Central had commissioned a new reality comedy show starring YouTuber Ben Phillips, who rose to fame when he started uploading videos on Facebook which show him pranking his brother, Elliot. The 22 minute pilot aired on 24 June 2017 on Comedy Central.

Broadcasts 
The pilot episode aired on 24 June 2017 Comedy Central at 11 pm.

References 

English-language television shows
Comedy Central (British TV channel) original programming
Television shows set in England
British reality television series
2017 British television series debuts
Television shows set in Wales